Fierce Harmony is a 1999 video game from Indigo Moon Productions. The game was available in trial form in April 1999.

Development
Fierce Harmony was showcased at E3 1997. In June 1997, WorldPlay Entertainment acquired the exclusive global online rights to the game. The game was developed with a budget of more than $600,000.

Reception

PC Joker gave the game a score of 42 out of 100 stating"Fierce Harmony may be quite nice as an animation demo, but as an alternative to "Virtua Fighter 2" the game fails across the board.

References

1999 video games
Video games developed in the United States
Windows games
Windows-only games